Reza Safaei (born June 27, 1990 in Kuhdasht) is an Iranian volleyball player who plays as an opposite  for the Iranian club Paykan.

Safaei in 2012 invited to Iran senior national team by Julio Velasco and made his debut match in the 2013 Islamic Solidarity Games in Indonesia.

Honours

National team
Islamic Solidarity Games

Gold medal (1): 2013

Club 
Gold medal (1): Asian Men's Club Volleyball Championship (2011)

Iranian Super League. 2014–15 Iranian Volleyball Super League

References

External links

Reza Safaei – Player experience
Reza Safaei on Instagram

1990 births
Living people
Iranian men's volleyball players
People from Kuhdasht
Islamic Solidarity Games competitors for Iran